William Albert James Manuel (born 28 June 1969) is an English retired professional football left back and midfielder, best remembered for his time in the Football League with Brentford and Gillingham. His tenacious performances in midfield for Brentford led to the nickname 'Billy the Pit Bull'.

Career

Gillingham 
Manuel began his career in the youth systems at First Division clubs Chelsea and Tottenham Hotspur, before dropping down to the Third Division to sign for Gillingham on 10 February 1989. His addition to the squad failed to help the struggling club avoid relegation to the Fourth Division at the end of the 1988–89 season and Manuel remained at Priestfield for two more forgettable seasons before leaving in June 1991. He made 97 appearances and scored four goals for the Gills.

Brentford 
Manuel moved back up to the Third Division to sign for Brentford in a £60,000 deal on 14 June 1991, to bring stability to the left back position. He made 45 appearances during the 1991–92 season and won the first silverware of his career when the Third Division title was clinched at the end of the campaign. In the newly renamed First Division, Manuel moved into the midfield and impressed enough to be voted the Brentford supporters' Player of the Year at the end of the season, though it would end in disappointment with relegation straight back to the Second Division. New manager David Webb installed Manuel as captain for the 1993–94 season and moved him to left back, though he gradually fell out of favour and was released in August 1994. Manuel made 115 appearances and scored two goals during three seasons with Brentford.

Peterborough United 
Manuel signed for Second Division club Peterborough United on a short-term contract on 16 September 1994. He failed to make an appearance before departing on 28 October.

Stevenage Borough (loan) 
Manuel joined high-flying Conference club Stevenage Borough on loan in late September 1994. He made three appearances before leaving Broadhall Way.

Cambridge United 
Manuel signed for Second Division strugglers Cambridge United on a three-month contract on 28 October 1994. He made 12 appearances before his contract expired.

Return to Peterborough United 
Manuel re-signed for Peterborough United on 28 February 1995, four months after leaving the club. He made 35 appearances and scored five goals before leaving London Road for the final time on 25 January 1996.

Return to Gillingham 
Manuel rejoined Gillingham, then flying high in the Third Division, on 26 January 1996. He helped the Gills to promotion to the Second Division with a second-place finish at the end of the 1995–96 season and made 11 appearances in 1996–97, before being released at the end of the campaign. In both his spells with Gillingham, Manuel made 118 appearances and scored four goals.

Barnet 
Manuel dropped back down to the Third Division to sign for Barnet prior to the beginning of the 1997–98 season. He made 38 appearances and scored one goal before being released at the end of the 1998–99 season.

Non-League football 
Manuel dropped into non-League football in 1999 and signed for Southern League First Division East club Folkestone Invicta and helped the club to promotion to the Premier Division in his first season. He was released as part of a cost-cutting exercise in December 2000. He moved on to play for Horsham, Grays Athletic, Tonbridge Angels, Bromley, Windsor & Eton, Waltham Forest and Metrogas before retiring in 2005.

Management career 
While a player at Folkestone Invicta, Manuel was also the club's assistant manager.

Personal life 
After his retirement from football, Manuel spent a period living in the USA before returning to his native Hackney to run a pub. He later worked in refurbishments.

Honours 
Brentford
Football League Third Division: 1991–92
Gillingham
Football League Third Division second-place promotion: 1995–96
Folkestone Invicta
Southern League First Division East: 1999–00

Individual

 Brentford Supporters' Player of the Year: 1992–93

Career statistics

References

External links

1969 births
Living people
English footballers
Gillingham F.C. players
Cambridge United F.C. players
Peterborough United F.C. players
Barnet F.C. players
Brentford F.C. players
Stevenage F.C. players
Footballers from the London Borough of Hackney
Folkestone Invicta F.C. players
Horsham F.C. players
Grays Athletic F.C. players
Tonbridge Angels F.C. players
Bromley F.C. players
Windsor & Eton F.C. players
Waltham Forest F.C. players
Southern Football League players
National League (English football) players
Isthmian League players
Association football fullbacks
Association football midfielders
Tottenham Hotspur F.C. players
Chelsea F.C. players
English expatriates in the United States
Metrogas F.C. players